Ørskog is a former municipality in Møre og Romsdal county, Norway. It was part of the Sunnmøre region. The administrative centre was the village of Sjøholt. The European Route E39/E136 highway runs through the municipality, connecting the towns of Ålesund and Molde. Rauma Group is the largest company in Ørskog in terms of turnover.

At the time if its dissolution in 2020, the  municipality was the 363rd largest by area out of the 422 municipalities in Norway. Ørskog is the 309th most populous municipality in Norway with a population of 2,267.

General information
Ørskog was established as a municipality on 1 January 1838 (see formannskapsdistrikt law). On 1 August 1883, the southwestern district of Ørskog (most of Ørskog on the southwestern side of the Storfjorden except for the Søvik and Ramstaddalen areas) was separated to form the new Søkelven Municipality. This left Ørskog with 1,735 inhabitants. On 1 June 1955, the Søvik and Ramstaddalen areas of Ørskog (south of the Storfjorden) were administratively transferred to Sykkylven Municipality. On 1 January 1965, Skodje Municipality (to the west) and Stordal Municipality (to the south) were merged into Ørskog to form a new, larger Ørskog Municipality. This merger was not long-lived. On 1 January 1977, the three municipalities were separated again.

On 1 January 2020, the municipality of Ørskog was merged with Haram Municipality, Skodje Municipality, Sandøy Municipality, and Ålesund Municipality to form one large municipality of Ålesund.

Name
The municipality (originally the parish) is named after the old Ørskog farm, since the first Ørskog Church was built there. The first element is the plural genitive case of øyrr which means "shoal" and the last element is skógr which means "wood" or "forest".

Coat of arms
The coat of arms was granted on 11 November 1983. The arms show a gold-colored wooden pole in the center with black and white ermine on each side of the pole. This was chosen as a symbol for forestry and fur farming. In the 17th century, the municipality exported many tall trees to the Dutch Republic, where they were used for shipbuilding. The ermine is a canting for the many animals in the forests.

Churches
The Church of Norway had one parish within the municipality of Ørskog. It is part of the Austre Sunnmøre prosti (deanery) in the Diocese of Møre.

Geography
The municipality lies on the north shore of the Storfjorden, and it is bordered by Skodje Municipality to the west, Vestnes Municipality to the north and east, and Stordal Municipality to the south. Most of the population lives along the shore or in the small valleys that stretch inland from the fjord. The eastern part of the municipality is mountainous.

At 10:00 p.m. on 8 January 1731, a landslide with a volume of possibly  fell from the mountain Skafjell from a height of  into the Storfjorden opposite Stranda. The slide generated a megatsunami  in height that struck Stranda, and damaging waves of lesser size traveled as far as Ørskog. It was the first natural disaster to be reported and documented in Norway in historic time.

Government
All municipalities in Norway, including Ørskog, are responsible for primary education (through 10th grade), outpatient health services, senior citizen services, unemployment and other social services, zoning, economic development, and municipal roads. The municipality is governed by a municipal council of elected representatives, which in turn elect a mayor.  The municipality falls under the Sunnmøre District Court and the Frostating Court of Appeal.

Municipal council
The municipal council of Ørskog is made up of 17 representatives that are elected to four year terms. The party breakdown for the final municipal council was as follows:

See also
List of former municipalities of Norway

References

External links

Municipal fact sheet from Statistics Norway 

 
Ålesund
Former municipalities of Norway
1838 establishments in Norway
2020 disestablishments in Norway
Populated places established in 1838
Populated places disestablished in 2020